Napier County is one of the 141 Cadastral divisions of New South Wales.

Napier County is named in honour of Field Marshal Robert Cornelius Napier, First Baron Napier of Magdala (1810-1890).

Parishes within this county
A full list of parishes found within this county; their current LGA and mapping coordinates to the approximate centre of each location is as follows:

References

Counties of New South Wales